Sri Lankan national cricket team toured South Africa from 18 December 2016 to 10 February 2017. The tour consisted of a series of three Tests, five One Day Internationals (ODIs) and three Twenty20 Internationals (T20Is). After the initial tour schedule was announced, the dates were moved slightly to accommodate South Africa's domestic T20 tournament.

On 12 December 2016 AB de Villiers stood down as South Africa's Test captain. He named his stand-in Faf du Plessis as replacement, a move that was confirmed by Cricket South Africa (CSA). Immediately prior to this series, du Plessis was found guilty of ball tampering during the second Test against Australia that took place in November 2016. He appealed the charge, but it was rejected. He lost his match fee from the second Test, but escaped the more serious charge of a one-match ban. De Villiers returned to team when he was named captain for the ODI fixtures. He also played in the third and final T20I match, with Farhaan Behardien retained as captain.

South Africa won the Test series 3–0. Sri Lanka won the T20I series 2–1, their first ever series win in any format in South Africa. South Africa won the ODI series 5–0 and moved to the number one position in the ICC ODI Championship.

Squads

Duanne Olivier was added to South Africa's squad following the second Test to replace Kyle Abbott, who earlier had quit international cricket to sign for the English team Hampshire as a Kolpak player. Nuwan Pradeep fractured his hand in the first T20I match and was ruled out of the rest of the tour. Following the second T20I, Angelo Mathews, Nuwan Pradeep and Danushka Gunathilaka all left Sri Lanka's squad. Pradeep and Gunathilaka suffered injuries, while Mathews left on personal grounds. Dinesh Chandimal was named the captain of the side in Mathews' absence. Lungi Ngidi was ruled out of the ODI series because of an abdominal injury. On the day before the first ODI, Sri Lanka dropped Isuru Udana, Thikshila de Silva and Seekkuge Prasanna replacing them with Lahiru Kumara, Vikum Sanjaya and Jeffrey Vandersay. David Miller was ruled out of the final three ODI matches after suffering a finger injury.

Tour match

Three-day match: South African Invitation XI v Sri Lankans

Test series

1st Test

2nd Test

3rd Test

T20I series

1st T20I

2nd T20I

3rd T20I

ODI series

1st ODI

2nd ODI

3rd ODI

4th ODI

5th ODI

References

External links
 Series home at ESPN Cricinfo

2016 in Sri Lankan cricket
2016 in South African cricket
Sri Lankan cricket tours of South Africa
International cricket competitions in 2016–17